Mindszent is a town in Csongrád county, in the Southern Great Plain region of southern Hungary.

Geography

External links

  in Hungarian

Populated places in Csongrád-Csanád County